The Transcaucasian spirlin (Alburnoides fasciatus) is a fish species in the family Cyprinidae. It is widespread in the Western Transcaucasia and rivers of the Black Sea coast in Turkey westward to the Kızılırmak River. It prefers rivers and streams with fast-running shallow water, over gravel, pebbles or rocks.

References 

 

fasciatus
Fish described in 1840
Freshwater fish of Western Asia